Hassan I Airport is an airport serving Laayoune, the largest city in Western Sahara. The airport is named after Hassan I of Morocco. It is operated by the Moroccan state-owned company ONDA. Due to the particular political situation of Western Sahara, this airport appears in the Moroccan AIP as GMML and in the Spanish AIP as GSAI.

Airlines and destinations 
The following airlines operate regular scheduled and charter flights at Laayoune Airport:

Statistics

See also 
 Legal status of Western Sahara

References

External links 

Airports in Western Sahara
Airport Hassan I
Buildings and structures in Laâyoune-Sakia El Hamra